Bodija is a district in Ibadan, Oyo State, Nigeria. The district gained prominence with the development of like-named high brow, a leafy residential estate created by the Western Nigeria Region after the independence of Nigeria. Most of the early homeowners were expats, judges, professors and high-ranking civil servants. The initial community of Old Bodija was expanded with the creation of a "New Bodija" in the '70s. The estate is home to many popular schools within the state. In the 80s a produce and timber market named Bodija Market was sited within proximity to the residential estate and is one of the largest Markets in Ibadan. The recent commercialization of the estate has resulted in the conversion of several of the residential buildings to offices and businesses.

External links
 Map of Bodija
 Tragedy in Bodija
 Transportation in Bodija Market

Populated places in Oyo State
Ibadan
Slums in Nigeria